The Proterra EcoRide BE35 is a  (nominal length) fast-charge battery electric bus that seats 38 (including the driver) with a total passenger capacity of 60 in its composite low floor body. Foothill Transit was the first transit agency to operate the buses in revenue service, starting in September 2010. It is the first  or larger, heavy-duty all-electric bus ever to complete federally required durability, reliability and safety testing at the Bus Research and Testing Center in Altoona, Pennsylvania. The 12yr/ STURAA test was completed on March 5, 2012.

The BE35's electric traction motor draws from lithium-titanate batteries supplied by Altairnano that can be recharged fully in 5–10 minutes while stopped at a bus stop via overhead terminals connected to a charging station, without driver involvement. The quick charging during a brief layover typically enables a further  of operation.

History

CEO Dale Hill and VP Phil Sweesy of Mobile Energy Solutions, LLC (MES) in Golden, Colorado had previously designed, engineered, and manufactured the 36 CNG-fueled TransTeq EcoMark I hybrid buses for the 16th Street Mall in Denver, Colorado. In 2006, MES announced it was designing a battery-electric bus codenamed "Origin One", recharged by onboard hydrogen fuel cells; the company announced it had already won a contract for two buses from the Greater New Haven Transit District, the transit agency serving New Haven, Connecticut. This was followed by a 2007 contract for two more fuel cell buses for Burbank, California; by this time the key characteristics were announced: a  composite body provided by Martin Marietta, lithium-titanate batteries, and plug-in charging in addition to onboard charging through the use of a range-extending auxiliary power unit (APU) consisting of two 16 kW fuel cells from Hydrogenics.

Developmental funding was provided by the Federal Transit Administration (FTA), who had awarded a grant under the National Fuel Cell Bus Program to a team led by the Center for Transportation and the Environment (CTE); CTE had selected MES to develop the prototype bus. MES was also a partner in the FTA's Electric Drive Strategic Plan program. MES acquired an old school bus to serve as a mobile development laboratory (MDL) for drivetrain development, including the battery, traction motor, and control system. The MDL was damaged after one battery cell leaked electrolyte, short-circuited, and caught on fire, leading MES to redesign its battery management system and add a protective enclosure for the battery modules in the finished prototype.

MES changed its name to Proterra in June 2008 and exhibited a prototype of the HFC35 transit bus that October at the American Public Transit Association Expo in San Diego. As shown with the fuel cell APU, Proterra claimed the HFC35 had a range of  before needing to be refueled or recharged. Alternatively, the HFC35 could be optioned with diesel, gasoline, or natural gas APUs.

In 2009, Proterra demonstrated a variant of the HFC35 that omitted the APU altogether, which Proterra named the EcoRide BE35. The BE35 stopped in four California cities during its weeklong tour: San Jose, Los Angeles, Sacramento, and San Francisco.

Deployment

The HFC35 prototype exhibited at APTA '08 in San Diego was later demonstrated in Washington, D.C. (Nov 2008) and a nationwide tour in regular service was scheduled for 2009, starting in Columbia, South Carolina as a football stadium shuttle for the University of South Carolina (with maintenance, refueling, and charging at Central Midlands Regional Transit Authority), with Capital Metro in Austin, Texas, and at the 2010 Olympic and Paralympic Winter Games in Vancouver, British Columbia. A second HFC35 was ordered by the City of Burbank, and a third was ordered by the United States Department of Defense (DoD) for use in Washington state. Burbank's HFC35 entered service in May 2010. The DoD HFC35 was delivered to Joint Base Lewis–McChord in Tacoma, Washington, where it was powered by hydrogen reformed from mewthane produced during wastewater treatment.

The first production BE35 was delivered to Foothill Transit in September 2010, operating as the "EcoLiner" on line 291 between Pomona and La Verne. Other agencies that purchased BE35 buses and charging equipment included the Nashville Metropolitan Transit Authority, Worcester Regional Transit Authority, San Joaquin Regional Transit District (Stockton), VIA Metropolitan Transit (San Antonio), StarMetro (Tallahassee), Regional Transportation Commission of Washoe County (Reno), and Clemson Area Transit (Seneca, South Carolina); most purchases were funded by more than $25 million in grants from the FTA's Transit Investments for Greenhouse Gas and Energy Reduction (TIGGER) program.

Proterra introduced the  Catalyst in 2014, featuring a longer range and new fast-charging system.

Design
Proterra drew inspiration from existing and prototype composite buses: the Neoplan USA , Advanced Technology Transit Bus (ATTB), and NABI CompoBus, concluding that a composite bus body was best suited to reduce weight and accommodate an equivalent number of seats (37) as a conventional  low-floor transit bus. The composite body forms were finished by Pearson Composites in Warren, Rhode Island, and the shells were assembled by C&C Fiberglass Components using vacuum-assisted resin transfer molding. Some of the people who helped develop ATTB would go on to work for MES.

Although the batteries can be recharged quickly, the overall capacity is low. The BE35 and HFC35 shared the same electric powertrain and battery design; while the HFC35 had a range-extending APU, no additional battery storage capacity was added to the BE35. The battery pack has a total storage capacity of 54 to 72 kW-hr, composed of three or four 18 kW-hr battery strings. Each string weighs . A single string is built from sixteen modules wired in series, each rated at 50 A-hr and 23 volts; the total string is 368 volts and 18.4 kW-hr, and three or four strings are used in parallel for the overall capacity of 54 or 72 kW-hr. In June 2016, Proterra announced it would grant royalty-free access to the patents covering their FastFill overhead charging system.

Proterra uses the TerraVolt branding for the battery system and ProDrive for the drivetrain module, which includes the traction motor and optional range-extending APU.

Testing
The first HFC35 prototype was not available for service for approximately two months to address a failure in a DC-DC converter, which provided the interface between the fuel cell APU and the traction battery.

Compared to the buses it replaces—conventional diesel buses average ; CNG buses return  diesel equivalent; and diesel-hybrid buses average about —the results are up to 600% better. During  of testing at Altoona for the first BE35, unscheduled maintenance included the replacement of the transmission (twice) and the traction motor (once).

Foothill Transit has been working with the California Air Resources Board and the United States Department of Energy National Renewable Energy Laboratory (NREL) to study the real-world performance of its Proterra buses. Observed economy for twelve BE35 buses in the Foothill Transit fleet was  diesel equivalent, compared to an observed  diesel equivalent for a fleet of eight NABI 42-BRT CNG-fueled buses. However, the BE35 fleet operates on circulator routes at slower speeds compared to the NABI CNG fleet, which were dispatched as needed to any Foothill Transit route. The BE35 fleet achieved an availability of 80.6%, less than the desired 85% availability due to constraints on parts availability and low-voltage battery (i.e., not the propulsion batteries) reliability; the NABI CNG fleet achieved an availability of 96.8%. Total maintenance costs for the BE35 fleet ($0.41/mi) is also higher than the maintenance cost for the NABI CNG fleet ($0.27/mi).

References

External links

 
 
 
 

Buses of the United States
Buses of Canada
Battery electric buses
Vehicles introduced in 2010
Low-floor buses
Single-deck buses
Proterra vehicles